Vilaboa (from the Latin villam bonam) is a municipality in Galicia, Spain, in the province of Pontevedra. The town is located on the Atlantic Ocean, on San Simon's Cove (Ensenada de San Simon), and is a part of Ria de Vigo.

In 2021, the recorded population was 6,033.

Parishes 

Vilaboa is made up of 5 distinct parishes:

 Bértola
 Cobres
 Figueirido
 Santa Cristina de Cobres
 Vilaboa

Festivals 

The most popular festival in Vilaboa is Carnival, celebrated mostly in two of the parishes - San Adrián de Cobres and Santa Cristina.

References

Municipalities in the Province of Pontevedra